Želodnik is a small settlement northeast of Domžale in the Upper Carniola region of Slovenia.

References

External links

Želodnik on Geopedia

Populated places in the Municipality of Domžale